Leonardo Campos Duarte da Silva (born 17 July 1996), commonly known as Léo Duarte, is a Brazilian professional footballer who plays as a centre-back for Super Lig club İstanbul Başakşehir.

Career

Early career
Duarte spend most of his youth career at Flamengo winning multiples competitions, the most important was the 2016 Copa São Paulo de Futebol Júnior, the top youth tournament in Brazil, being the team captain and lifting the trophy. He had a solid tournament, being praised and along with Felipe Vizeu and Ronaldo, Duarte received has been praised as a player ready to be promoted to the professional team. Few weeks later all three players started training with the professional team.

Flamengo
On 5 March 2016, Duarte debuted as a starter in a 3–1 win over Bangu on a 2016 Rio de Janeiro State League match. In this particular game Flamengo fielded several young players and reserves.

Due to injuries and transfers throughout the 2016 season Duarte played in another eight matches, including seven in the 2016 Brazilian Série A and one appearance in 2016 Copa do Brasil, all matches as starter. His first Brazilian Série A match was on 14 May 2016 in a 1–0 win against Sport at Estádio Raulino de Oliveira in Volta Redonda.

On 22 August 2018, Duarte extended his contract with Flamengo until December 2022.

AC Milan
On 27 July 2019, Brazilian press announced the agreement between Flamengo and AC Milan in a €10 million transfer with a clause that could potentially rise to €11 million. On 7 August 2019, Duarte was officially announced as a Milan player on a five-year deal. He made his debut on 29 September 2019, in a 3–1 league defeat to Fiorentina.

İstanbul Başakşehir (loan)
On 11 January 2021, Duarte joined Turkish club İstanbul Başakşehir on loan until 30 June 2022. The deal includes the option to buy.

İstanbul Başakşehir 
On 8 July 2022, Başakşehir announced the permanent signing of Duarte on a 4 year deal.

Personal life
On 23 September 2020, he tested positive for COVID-19.

Career statistics

Honours
Flamengo
 Campeonato Carioca: 2017, 2019

References

External links

Flamengo Léo Duarte Profile
Instagram
Facebook

1996 births
Living people
Footballers from São Paulo (state)
Brazilian footballers
Association football defenders
Campeonato Brasileiro Série A players
CR Flamengo footballers
Serie A players
Süper Lig players
A.C. Milan players
İstanbul Başakşehir F.K. players
Brazilian expatriate footballers
Brazilian expatriate sportspeople in Italy
Brazilian expatriate sportspeople in Turkey
Expatriate footballers in Italy
Expatriate footballers in Turkey
People from Mococa